Geniostoma confertiflorum is a species of plant in the Loganiaceae family endemic to Fiji.

References

Endemic flora of Fiji
confertiflorum
Least concern plants
Taxonomy articles created by Polbot